The South Carolina Gamecocks women's volleyball team represents the University of South Carolina in NCAA Division I college volleyball.  Since 1991, the team has competed in the eastern division of the Southeastern Conference. Home games are played at Volleyball Competition Center, which sits adjacent to the Carolina Coliseum. Quick facts on the facility include:
Cost to Build: $4.6 Million
Year Opened: 1996
Seating Capacity: 1,600
Attendance Record: 2,041 (Sept. 4, 2016 vs Clemson)

Head coaches

Year-by-Year Results

See also

South Carolina Gamecocks beach volleyball
List of NCAA Division I women's volleyball programs

References

External links